Maurycy is a given name. Notable people with the name include:

Jan Maurycy Pawel Cardinal Puzyna de Kosielsko (1842–1911), Polish Roman Catholic Cardinal
Maurycy Beniowski or Maurice Benyovszky (1746–1786), explorer, colonizer, writer, chess player, soldier
Maurycy Gottlieb (1856–1879), Jewish painter of Polish-speaking Galician Jews from the western part of Ukraine
Maurycy Hauke, also known as John Maurice Hauke, (1775–1830), professional soldier
Maurycy Klemens Zamoyski (1871–1939), Polish nobleman, politician, social activist, Minister of Foreign Affairs of Poland
Maurycy Mochnacki (1803–1834), Polish literary, theatre and music critic, publicist, journalist, pianist, historian and independence activist
Maurycy Orzech (1891–1943), Polish-Jewish economist, journalist, politician and a leader of the Jewish Bund in interwar Poland
Maurycy Pius Rudzki (born 1862), the first person to call himself a professor of geophysics
Maurycy Stefanowicz (born 1976), Polish musician and guitarist
Maurycy Zych, also known as Stefan Żeromski, (1864–1925), Polish novelist and dramatist

See also

Maurice
Mauryca
Maurycew
Maurycow
Maurzyce
Muricy

Polish masculine given names